The list of ship launches in 1912 includes a chronological list of ships launched in 1912.


References

Sources
 

 
 

1912